In the Standard Model of particle physics, the Cabibbo–Kobayashi–Maskawa matrix, CKM matrix, quark mixing matrix, or KM matrix is a unitary matrix which contains information on the strength of the flavour-changing weak interaction. Technically, it specifies the mismatch of quantum states of quarks when they propagate freely and when they take part in the weak interactions. It is important in the understanding of CP violation. This matrix was introduced for three generations of quarks by Makoto Kobayashi and Toshihide Maskawa, adding one generation to the matrix previously introduced by Nicola Cabibbo. This matrix is also an extension of the GIM mechanism, which only includes two of the three current families of quarks.

The matrix

Predecessor – the Cabibbo matrix

In 1963, Nicola Cabibbo introduced the Cabibbo angle to preserve the universality of the weak interaction. 
Cabibbo was inspired by previous work by Murray Gell-Mann and  Maurice Lévy,
on the effectively rotated nonstrange and strange vector and axial weak currents, which he references.

In light of current concepts (quarks had not yet been proposed), the Cabibbo angle is related to the relative probability that down and strange quarks decay into up quarks  ( ||   and   || , respectively).
Mathematically this is:

or using the Cabibbo angle:

Using the currently accepted values for   ||   and   ||   (see below), the Cabibbo angle can be calculated using

When the charm quark was discovered in 1974, it was noticed that the down and strange quark could decay into either the up or charm quark, leading to two sets of equations:

or using the Cabibbo angle:

This can also be written in matrix notation as:

or using the Cabibbo angle

where the various || represent the probability that the quark of flavor  decays into a quark of flavor . This 2×2 rotation matrix is called the "Cabibbo matrix", and was subsequently expanded to the 3×3 CKM matrix.

CKM matrix

In 1973, observing that CP-violation could not be explained in a four-quark model, Kobayashi and Maskawa generalized the Cabibbo matrix into the Cabibbo–Kobayashi–Maskawa matrix (or CKM matrix) to keep track of the weak decays of three generations of quarks:

On the left are the weak interaction doublet partners of down-type quarks, and on the right is the CKM matrix, along with a vector of mass eigenstates of down-type quarks. The CKM matrix describes the probability of a transition from one flavour  quark to another flavour  quark. These transitions are proportional to ||.

As of 2020, the best determination of the magnitudes of the CKM matrix elements was:

Using those values, one can check the unitarity of the CKM matrix. In particular, we find that the first-row matrix elements give:  

Although the value seems very nearly 1, its discrepancy is 0.0015; with a standard error of 0.0005, it is 3 standard deviations away from the expected value of 1, in apparent violation of the unitarity condition. This is an interesting hint of physics beyond the Standard Model.

The choice of usage of down-type quarks in the definition is a convention, and does not represent a physically preferred asymmetry between up-type and down-type quarks. Since the CKM matrix is unitary, its inverse is the same as its conjugate transpose, which the alternate choices use; it appears as the same matrix, in a slightly altered form.

General case construction
To generalize the matrix, count the number of physically important parameters in this matrix  which appear in experiments. If there are  generations of quarks (2 flavours) then

 2 − 1 of these parameters are not physically significant, because one phase can be absorbed into each quark field (both of the mass eigenstates, and of the weak eigenstates), but the matrix is independent of a common phase. Hence, the total number of free variables independent of the choice of the phases of basis vectors is 2 − (2 − 1) = ( − 1)2.
 Of these, ( − 1) are rotation angles called quark mixing angles.
 The remaining ( − 1)( − 2) are complex phases, which cause CP violation.

= 2 
For the case  = 2, there is only one parameter, which is a mixing angle between two generations of quarks. Historically, this was the first version of CKM matrix when only two generations were known. It is called the Cabibbo angle after its inventor Nicola Cabibbo.

= 3 
For the Standard Model case ( = 3), there are three mixing angles and one CP-violating complex phase.

Observations and predictions
Cabibbo's idea originated from a need to explain two observed phenomena:
the transitions   and  had similar amplitudes.

For two generations of quarks, there are no CP violating phases, as shown by the counting of the previous section. Since CP violations had already been seen in 1964, in neutral kaon decays, the Standard Model that emerged soon after clearly indicated the existence of a third generation of quarks, as Kobayashi and Maskawa pointed out in 1973. The discovery of the bottom quark at Fermilab (by Leon Lederman's group) in 1976 therefore immediately started off the search for the top quark, the missing third-generation quark.

Note, however, that the specific values that the angles take on are not a prediction of the standard model: They are free parameters. At present, there is no generally-accepted theory that explains why the angles should have the values that are measured in experiments.

Weak universality
The constraints of unitarity of the CKM-matrix on the diagonal terms can be written as

for all generations . This implies that the sum of all couplings of any one of the up-type quarks to all the down-type quarks is the same for all generations. This relation is called weak universality and was first pointed out by Nicola Cabibbo in 1967. Theoretically it is a consequence of the fact that all SU(2) doublets couple with the same strength to the vector bosons of weak interactions. It has been subjected to continuing experimental tests.

The unitarity triangles
The remaining constraints of unitarity of the CKM-matrix can be written in the form

Their shapes can be very different, but they all have the same area, which can be related to the CP violating phase. The area vanishes for the specific parameters in the Standard Model for which there would be no CP violation. The orientation of the triangles depend on the phases of the quark fields.

A popular quantity amounting to twice the area of the unitarity triangle is the Jarlskog invariant, 
 
For Greek indices denoting up quarks and Latin ones down quarks, the 4-tensor  is doubly antisymmetric,

so that 

Since the three sides of the triangles are open to direct experiment, as are the three angles, a class of tests of the Standard Model is to check that the triangle closes. This is the purpose of a modern series of experiments under way at the Japanese BELLE and the American BaBar experiments, as well as at LHCb in CERN, Switzerland.

Parameterizations
Four independent parameters are required to fully define the CKM matrix.  Many parameterizations have been proposed, and three of the most common ones are shown below.

KM parameters
The original parameterization of Kobayashi and Maskawa used three angles and a CP-violating phase angle.  is the Cabibbo angle.

"Standard" parameters
A "standard" parameterization of the CKM matrix uses three Euler angles and one CP-violating phase.  is the Cabibbo angle. Couplings between quark generations  and  vanish if .

The 2008 values for the standard parameters were:
 = ,  = ,   = 
and
 =  radians = .

Wolfenstein parameters
The four Wolfenstein parameters have the property that all are of order 1 and are related to the 'standard' parameterization:
{|
|-
| 
| 
|-
| 
| 
|-
| 
| 
|}

Although the Wolfenstein parameterization of the CKM matrix can be as exact as desired when carried to high order, it is mainly used for generating convenient approximations to the standard parameterization. The approximation to order , good to better than 0.3% accuracy, is:

Using the values of the previous section for the CKM matrix, as of 2008 the best determination of the Wolfenstein parameter values is:
 = ,      = ,          = ,   and    = .

Nobel Prize
In 2008, Kobayashi and Maskawa shared one half of the Nobel Prize in Physics "for the discovery of the origin of the broken symmetry which predicts the existence of at least three families of quarks in nature". Some physicists were reported to harbor bitter feelings about the fact that the Nobel Prize committee failed to reward the work of Cabibbo, whose prior work was closely related to that of Kobayashi and Maskawa. Asked for a reaction on the prize, Cabibbo preferred to give no comment.

See also
 Formulation of the Standard Model and CP violations
 Quantum chromodynamics, flavour and strong CP problem
 Weinberg angle, a similar angle for Z and photon mixing
 Pontecorvo–Maki–Nakagawa–Sakata matrix, the equivalent mixing matrix for neutrinos
 Koide formula

References

Further reading and external links
 

 

 

 
 

Standard Model
Electroweak theory
Matrices